Chŏngp'yŏng County is a county in South Hamgyŏng province, North Korea.  It borders South P'yŏngan province to the south, and the East Korea Bay to the east.

Physical features
The highest point is Noranbong.  Most of the county's land is mountainous, but the southeast region is flat. The chief river is the Kumjin River.  In the winter, its climate is continental and the weather is bitterly cold; however, the influence of the Rangrim Mountains makes Chŏngp'yŏng's climate milder than that of the Yellow Sea coast.

Administrative divisions
Chŏngp'yong county is divided into 1 ŭp (town), 2 rodongjagu (workers' districts) and 42 ri (villages):

Economy

Agriculture and fishery
Rice is cultivated on the level ground of the southeast, where the soil is fertile. Small amounts of other farming and orcharding also take place. Due to the county's coastal location, fishing is also practised.

Mining
Mining is a minor component of the local economy.

Transport
Chŏngp'yŏng county is served by the P'yŏngra Line of the Korean State Railway.

See also
Geography of North Korea
Administrative divisions of North Korea

References

External links

Counties of South Hamgyong